The 2020–21 Austrian Regionalliga  was the 62nd season of the Austrian third-tier football league.

The Regionalliga is split into five sections, (Tirol, Voralberg, Salzburg, Mitte and Ost).

The season was abandoned midway through due to the Covid-19 global pandemic, therefore no promotions or relegations took place.

Regular season

Tirol

Voralberg

Salzburg

Mitte

Ost

See also
 2020–21 Austrian Football Bundesliga
 2020–21 Austrian Football Second League
 2020–21 Austrian Cup

References

External links
 Regionalliga Ost at Worldfootball.net
 Regionalliga Mitte at Worldfootball.net
 Regionalliga West at Worldfootball.net

Austrian Regionalliga seasons
2020–21 in Austrian football
Aus